Mark Anthony Campbell (born September 12, 1972) is an American former college and professional football player who was a defensive tackle for the Arizona Cardinals of the National Football League (NFL). Campbell attended Miami Sunset High School in Miami, Florida. He received an athletic scholarship to attend the University of Florida in Gainesville, Florida, where he played for coach Steve Spurrier's Florida Gators football team from 1992 to 1995. He was drafted by the Denver Broncos in the third round of the 1996 NFL Draft, and played a single season for the Arizona Cardinals in 1997. Campbell was also a member of the Orlando Rage of the XFL.

See also
 Florida Gators football, 1990–99
 List of Florida Gators in the NFL Draft

References

External links
Just Sports Stats
XFL profile

Living people
1972 births
Players of American football from Miami
American football defensive tackles
Florida Gators football players
Arizona Cardinals players
Orlando Rage players
Miami Sunset Senior High School alumni